Topallar is a village in the Amasra District, Bartın Province, Turkey. Its population is 64 (2021).

History 
The name of the village is mentioned as Topal in the records of 1927.

Geography 
The village is 33 km away from Bartın city center and 18 km away from Amasra town centre.

References

Villages in Amasra District